San Pedro de Lóvago is a city in the Chontales Department of Nicaragua. It is a small town, which mainly consists of farming. It is a region located in the highlands of central Nicaragua.

Municipalities of the Chontales Department